The Bozani is a left tributary of the river Cârpeștii Mici in Romania. It flows into the Cârpeștii Mici in Dușești.

References

Rivers of Romania
Rivers of Bihor County